Specto is a free and open-source Linux application for watching web changes.

References

Linux software